Narnia is a fantasy world created by C. S. Lewis as the primary location for his series of seven fantasy novels for children, The Chronicles of Narnia. The world is named after the country of Narnia, where much of the Chronicles takes place.

In Narnia, some animals talk, mythical beasts abound, and magic is common. The series tracks the story of Narnia when humans, usually children, enter the Narnian world from Earth.

Inspiration 

The landscape of Lewis's native Ireland, in particular Ulster, played a large part in the creation of the Narnian landscape. In his essay On Stories, Lewis wrote "I have seen landscapes, notably in the Mourne Mountains and southwards which under a particular light made me feel that at any moment a giant might raise his head over the next ridge". In a letter to his brother, Lewis would later confide "that part of Rostrevor which overlooks Carlingford Lough is my idea of Narnia". Although in adult life Lewis lived in England, he returned to Northern Ireland often and retained fond memories of the Irish scenery, saying "I yearn to see County Down in the snow; one almost expects to see a march of dwarfs dashing past. How I long to break into a world where such things were true."

Beginning in 1906, young C.S Lewis (1898–1963) visited the northern Irish seaside near Portrush many times. In later years, Lewis remembered the sounds of the sea, the cliffs rising above it, and the ruined medieval towers of Dunluce Castle which many authors have speculated may have inspired his creation of Cair Paravel.

Narnia and Narni, Italy 
Concerning Narnia and Narni Roger Lancelyn Green writes about C.S. Lewis and Walter Hooper:

Fictional geography
The novels revolve around the fantastical country of Narnia. Archenland is a mountainous country south of Narnia. It is bordered on the north by Narnia and on the south by the Winding Arrow river. The seat of government is at Anvard, in the heart of the country, a fortified area. 

Calormen is a semi-arid empire in the south of the world of Narnia. The capital of Calormen is Tashbaan, located on an island near the mouth of the River of Calormen, which flows from west to east in the north of Calormen, just south of the Great Desert, which the desert could be a country in its own right. The city of Azim Balda, to the south of Tashbaan, is a hub where many roads meet; it hosts the government's postal system. To Calormen's south is unclear but many have speculated that its a subcontinent called the Southern Waste. 

North of Narnia are two countries inhabited by Giants and Ettins. Ettinsmoore is a cold barren plane home to the once civilized, now anarchistic giants, and north of the Ettinsmoore are the colder mountainous Wild Lands of the North. Like Ettinsmoore, the Wild Lands of the North used to be a much more advanced nation but deteriorated into ruins, including the presumed capital the Ruined City of the Giants, although its castle Harfang is still inhabited by functional Giants. The Giant Civilization at one point likely rivaled the Calormen Empire. Beyond this nation is presumably an icy tundra, which like the Great Desert, could be a country in its own right, which in turn is attached to Aslan's Country. 

East of Narnia is the Great Eastern Ocean, where the Bight of Calormen is home to the Merpeople and the islands of Galma, Terabithia, Seven Isles, and the Lone Islands. Beyond the Bight of Calormen is more ocean, including the islands of Dragon Island, Burnt Island, Death Water Island, Island of the Duffers, Dark Island, and the Island of the Star. Beyond the Island of the Star, is another undersea country called the Last Sea, water lilies, and the Utter East, which is a small landslide plane, bordering the high mountains of Aslan's Country. 

To Narnia's west is the landlocked Western Wild, and somewhere beyond this is Telmar, and eventually on the other side of the unnamed continent is the Western Sea, which presumably has an Utter West at its end, bordering Aslan's Country. 

Deep below Narnia's surface is a dark sunless country Underland and even deeper than that, at the world's base, is the fiery nation of Bism, home to the Gnomes and Salamanders.

Fictional cosmology
The flat world of Narnia is connected to Earth and many other worlds through a nexus called the Wood between the Worlds. Travel is possible through a pool each for every world. The Wood is so named by Polly Plummer, who is transported there when Digory Kirke's Uncle Andrew tricks her into picking up a magic yellow ring. It has a slothful influence on those travelling it, which is explained by C.S. Lewis as the Wood being a place where nothing ever happens, unlike the different worlds that it connects. For the child protagonists, this experience is pleasant and relaxing. However, it affects the White Witch Jadis negatively: she shrieks in despair that the wood is "killing" her, and she is sickly and pale. It could be described as a nexus of sorts, existing outside the other worlds and not being a world on its own. The wood derives its name from The Wood Beyond the World, a fantasy novel by William Morris, an author who Lewis greatly admired. However, the location's function stems from another Morris novel, The Well at the World's End. Some scholars have suggested Dante's Divine Comedy or Algnernon Blackwood's "The Education of Uncle Paul", both of which Lewis was known to have enjoyed, as possible secondary influences.

Fictional timeline
Lewis provided a timeline of events related to The Chronicles of Narnia, in emulation of The Tale of the Years chronology in J. R. R. Tolkien's The Lord of the Rings. He gave an "Outline of Narnian History" in manuscript form to Walter Hooper, who included it in his essay Past Watchful Dragons: The Fairy Tales of C. S. Lewis. The novels never explicitly mention the year or years in which events take place, so the timeline is the only source for this information. Kathryn Lindskoog, along with other Lewis's scholars, has challenged the authenticity of some posthumous works attributed to Lewis and edited by Hooper, but the validity of the outline in particular has not been questioned. The outline is accepted by Lewis experts and has been included in works by Paul Ford, Martha Sammons and others.

Consistency with other works
Several people have pointed out more or less significant areas where Lewis's Outline is not consistent with the text of the Chronicles. For example, the outline dates Queen Swanwhite , though according to The Last Battle she ruled Narnia before Jadis returned (meaning that her reign must have ended before 898). Paul Ford, author of Companion to Narnia, points out that the text of The Lion, the Witch and the Wardrobe states that Lucy and Edmund are one year apart in age; the years given in the timeline for their births, 1930 and 1932 respectively, would put their ages at something more than a year. Devin Brown, author of Inside Narnia: A Guide to Exploring The Lion, the Witch, and the Wardrobe, uses the timeline as a way to reconcile some of the statements concerning the timing of Aslan's appearances in Narnia with other characters' recollections of those appearances.

See also

 Outline of Narnia
 Pauline Baynes, original illustrator for the Narnia books and maps; she also illustrated some of J. R. R. Tolkien's books, and drew two poster maps of Middle-earth (but not the ones published in the books).
 The Chronicles of Narnia (film series)—for details on the films
 Land of Oz
 Middle-earth
 Neverland
 Wonderland

References

External links
 HarperCollins site for the books
 Disney Map of Narnia NarniaMap.jpg, 2244 x 1692,  1359 KB
 Six maps of Narnia

Fictional elements introduced in 1950
 
 
Fantasy worlds
Fictional dimensions